This a list of mountains situated in Argentina, South America. The list also shows the height of each mountain.

Mountains 
 Aconcagua (Mendoza) 6,962 m
Nevado El Plomo 6,070 m
Cerro Ameghino approx. 5,940 m
 Ojos del Salado (Catamarca) 6,893 m
Tres Cruces Sur 6,748 m
Cazadero 6,658 m
El Muerto 6,488 m
Cerro Nacimiento 6,436 m
Cerro Veladero 6,436 m
Cerro El Cóndor (also Volcán Sarmiento) 6,414 m
Cerro Vallecitos 6,168 m
Tres Quebradas (also Los Patos) 6,239 m
Cerro Medusa 6,120 m
Colorados 6,080 m
Cerro El Fraile 6,061 m
Volcán del Viento 6,028 m
Cerro San Francisco 6,018 m
 Monte Pissis (La Rioja) 6,795 m
 Cerro Bonete (La Rioja) 6,759 m
 Llullaillaco (Salta) 6,723 m
Socompa 6,051 m
 Mercedario (San Juan) 6,720 m
Cerro Ramada 6,384 m
Cerro La Mesa 6,230 m
 Incahuasi (Catamarca) 6,621 m
 Tupungato (Mendoza) 6,570 m
Cerro Alto San Juan 6,148 m
Cerro Negro Pabellón 6,070 m
Cerro Polleras 5,993m
 Antofalla (Salta) 6,440 m
 Cachi (Nevado de Cachi) 6,380 m
Cerro Quemado 6,184 m
 Reclus 6,335 m
 Majadita 6,280 m
Cerro Olivares 6,216 m
 Cerro Solo 6,205 m
 Cerro El Toro (San Juan) 6,168 m
 Cerro Tortolas 6,160 m
 Queva 6,140 m
 Colangüil 6,122 m
 Marmolejo 6,108 m
 Medusa 6,130 m
 Nevado de Famatina (also Cerro Belgrano) 6,097 m
 Aracar 6,095m
 Cerro Baboso (also Veladero N.E.) approx. 6,070 m
 Cerro Salin (Salín) 6,029 m
 Cerro Laguna Blanca 6,012 m
 Cerro Plata (Mendoza) 5,955 m
 Cerro Chañi (Jujuy) approx. 5,930 m
 Galán (Catamarca) 5,920 m

See also 
 List of volcanoes in Argentina

References 

Argentina
Mountains
Argentina